The Commuter Aircraft Corporation CAC-100 was a 50–60 seat, four-engined, turboprop commuter airliner developed in the United States in the late 1970s and early 1980s.

Design and development
The design of the CAC-100 originated from the General Aircraft Corporation GAC-100, designed in the late 1960s. The GAC-100 design was enlarged and new technologies incorporated to produce the CAC-100. The proposed production aircraft featured an extended span wing with leading edge slats removed to reduce structural complexity, weight and cost. Other changes under consideration at the time of initial production were direction of undercarriage retraction and retention of the variable incidence tailplane.

The CAC-100 was designed as a low wing monoplane with four turboprop engines mounted on the leading edges of the wings. The all-metal fail-safe semi-monocoque tubular fuselage was to have been pressurized and to accommodate a flight crew of two, 50–60 passengers, a single stewardess, a coat compartment, galley and toilet, as well as a pressurized baggage compartment aft of the main cabin. The mainplanes were constructed as two-spar fail-safe structures from 2024-T4 light alloy supporting the engines, ailerons and hydraulically actuated single slotted flaps. Pneumatic de-icing boots on the fin and rudder leading edges ensured ice free operation.

The conventional tail unit incorporated a variable incidence tailplane with rudder and elevators all with trim tabs and servo tabs. Hydraulically actuated ailerons operated in conjunction with upper surface spoilers inboard of the ailerons and forward of the outer flap segment. All powered controls were also to be provided with manual cable-operated backups.

The tricycle landing gear consisted of hydraulically retracting nose and main gears with twin wheels and brakes on the mainwheels, with the nose gear retracting into the nose of the aircraft and the main legs retracting into extended inboard engine nacelles.

Power was to be supplied by four Pratt & Whitney Canada PT6A-65R turboprop engines driving five-bladed Hartzell Propeller constant speed reversible propellers.

Production facilities were constructed at Youngstown Municipal Airport in Youngstown, Ohio but the project was shelved in 1983 before its first flight.

Specifications (variant specified)

See also

Notes

External links
 

Aircraft manufactured in the United States
1980s United States airliners